'Mark Pinili Javier is a professional archer from the Philippines. He competed in Archery at the 2006 Asian Games in Doha, Qatar but was defeated by the Korean Im Dong Hyun  113-104 in the 1/16 Elimination Round. During the 2006 Asian Games he landed 9th place in the individual category.

An alumnus of Silliman University with a Bachelor of Science in Information Technology degree, Mark Javier was also a member of the Silliman University Dumaguete Archery Club (SUDAC) and the National Archery Association of the Philippines (NAAP). He won medals in local and national competitions as well as joined international competitions.

2008 Summer Olympics
At the 2008 Summer Olympics in Beijing Javier finished his ranking round with a total of 654 points. This gave him the 36th seed for the final competition bracket in which he faced Kuo Cheng Wei in the first round. Kuo won the match with 106-102 and advanced to the next round in which he was beaten by Park Kyung-Mo.

2012 Summer Olympics
At the 2012 Summer Olympics, Javier qualified for the last 32, where he was knocked out by Brady Ellison.

References

Living people
Filipino male archers
Olympic archers of the Philippines
Archers at the 2008 Summer Olympics
Archers at the 2012 Summer Olympics
1981 births
Silliman University alumni
Archers at the 2006 Asian Games
Archers at the 2010 Asian Games
People from Dumaguete
Sportspeople from Negros Oriental
Competitors at the 2017 Southeast Asian Games
Asian Games competitors for the Philippines
Southeast Asian Games competitors for the Philippines